Clinopodium nepeta subsp. nepeta is a subspecies of flowering plants in the family Lamiaceae.

References

D. Ristorcelli, F. Tomi, J. Casanova, (1996).Essential oils of Calamintha nepeta subsp. nepeta and subsp. glandulosa from Corsica (France), Journal of essential oil research: JEOR (USA).

nepeta subsp. nepeta
Plant subspecies